Kirsi Kainulainen (born 23 November 1985 in Iisalmi) is a Finnish motorcycle racer.

Sidecar class 
In 2015, Kainulainen made history by winning the World Championship bronze as the first woman in track motorcycling in the sidecar class with Pekka Päivärinta.

In the 2016 season, she also made history by being the first woman to win a FIM World Championship in motorcycling with men in the same series, winning the 2016 FIM Sidecar World Championship with Pekka Päivärinna on a LCR BMW

Solo classes 
In the solo classes Kainulainen has ridden on the track at the Finnish Championship, PM and European Championships in classes 125cc and 600cc. She has also been successful on the ice racing at the national level both in solo in different classes and in the sidecar class with Päivärinta.

In 2018, Kainulainen signed a contract with the Dutch racing team and drove the Ow-cup series in Europe.

In the 2019 season, she returned to the colours of her own Motorsline Kainulainen team and drove the international Alpe Adrian series in Europe.

Competitive success 
 2006: SM Bronze Roadracing 125cc
 2007: PM Bronze Roadracing 125cc
 2014: Ice rink sidecar SM championship silver.
 2015: Third place in the FIM Sidecar World Championship
 2016: Ice track sidecar class SM-silver.
 2016: First place in the FIM Sidecar World Championship
 2018: Return to the track motorcycle solo career (OW-cup)
 2019: International Alpe Adriatic Series for Track Motorcycling. 600cc STK class 7th place in the end points.
 2020: The first woman on the ice track to have been on the podium (3rd place) in the B 450cc class.

References

External links
 Päivärinta Racing: Team
   FIM Sidecar World Championship

Living people
1985 births
Finnish motorcycle racers
Sidecar racers
People from Iisalmi
Sportspeople from North Savo